The 2022–23 Ukrainian First League is the 32nd since its establishment. The league competition consisted of 16 teams. The competition is conducting during the ongoing war with the Russia since late February 2022. It was decided to conduct competitions in two groups.

Format 
Due to the Russo-Ukrainian War, the league competitions changed its usual format. The Professional Football League of Ukraine (PFL) Conference adopted changes to the 2022–23 season after some 24 PFL teams were forced to suspend their activities or dissolve. It was decided to keep the same number of participants at 16 but split them in two groups of 8. Previously the split group competition in the second tier were only conducted once back in 1992. 

The competitions are scheduled to consist of two stages. At the first stage two groups of 8 would conduct a usual double round-robin tournament. At the second stage, the top four from each group form the promotion group, while the bottom four from each group – the relegation group. Points earned at the first stage will be kept for the second, while teams would only be playing with participants of the group. So, in total each team is expected to play 22 games. The top two teams of the promotion group receive direct promotion to the Ukrainian Premier League (UPL), while the 3rd and the 4th would play promotion relegation play-off with the 14th and the 13th teams of UPL, respectfully. In case if Desna and Mariupol would decide to return, play-off games will be canceled and the UPL will be expanded. The bottom team of the relegation group will be relegated directly, while the second to the last will contest its place in the second tier with the 2022–23 Ukrainian Second League runner-up.

Teams 
This season, Ukrainian First League consisted of 16 teams.

Promoted teams 
Ten teams have been promoted from the 2021–22 Ukrainian Second League. While originally it had been expected that MFA Mukachevo would be promoted, in less than a month it was confirmed that the club will not participate in the season. Later along with VPK-Ahro, it was replaced with Bukovyna and Chernihiv.
 Karpaty Lviv – first place in Group A (returning after 17 seasons, last competed in the 2005–06)
 LNZ Cherkasy – second place in Group A (debut)
 Dinaz Vyshhorod – fourth place in Group A (debut)
 Epitsentr Dunaivtsi – fifth place in Group A (debut)
 Bukovyna Chernivtsi – ninth place in Group A (returning after 5 seasons)
 Chernihiv – tenth place in Group A (debut)
 Metalurh Zaporizhzhia – first place in Group B (returning after 2 seasons, last competed in the 2019–20)
 Skoruk Tomakivka – second place in Group B (debut)
 Poltava – sixth place in Group B (debut)
 Mariupol – eleventh place in Group B (debut)

Relegated teams 
Eight clubs withdrew from the league due to the Russian aggression.

Renamed teams 
 FSC Mariupol is a successor of Yarud Mariupol.
 Epitsentr Kamianets-Podilskyi has officially moved from Dunaivtsi to Kamianets-Podilskyi.

Location map 
The following displays the location of teams. Group A teams marked in red. Group B teams marked in green.

Stadiums 

The following stadiums were used as home grounds for the teams in the competition. The minimum capacity for stadiums of the First League clubs is set at 1,500 spectators.

Personnel and sponsorship

Managerial changes

Group A league table

Results

Group A goalscorers

Clean sheets

Group B league table

Results

Group B goalscorers

Hat-tricks

Clean sheets

Promotion group league table

Results

Promotion group goalscorers

Clean sheets

Relegation group league table

Results

Relegation group goalscorers

Clean sheets

Awards

Monthly awards

Round awards 
Fall half

Spring half

Number of teams by region

See also
 2022–23 Ukrainian Premier League
 2022–23 Ukrainian Second League
 2022–23 Ukrainian Football Amateur League
 List of Ukrainian football transfers summer 2021

References 

Ukrainian First League seasons
2022–23 in Ukrainian association football leagues
Ukraine
Sports events affected by the 2022 Russian invasion of Ukraine
Current association football seasons